Eochaid mac Óengusa (died 522) was a King of Munster from the ruling Eoganachta dynasty. He was the son of Óengus mac Nad Froích (died 489), the first Christian king of Munster.

The chronology of the 6th century Munster kings is confusing in the sources. According to the Laud Synchronisms, he succeeded his father as king and was a contemporary of the high king Lugaid mac Lóegairi which would place the start of his reign before 507. However, in the Book of Leinster, he succeeded his brother Feidlimid mac Óengusa.

He had two sons born on the same night: Crimthann Srem (Feimin), ancestor of the Glendamnach sept (Glanworth, County Cork) of Eoganachta and another Crimthann by a woman named Dearcon (possibly of the Arada Cliach), ancestor of the Arithir Cliach sept (Tipperary town area) of Eoganachta. it is possible that the creation of two separate Crimthanns was an invention of the genealogists. He was succeeded by his son Crimthann Srem mac Echado.

.

Notes

See also
Kings of Munster

References

 Annals of Tigernach at CELT: Corpus of Electronic Texts at University College Cork
 Byrne, Francis John (2001), Irish Kings and High-Kings, Dublin: Four Courts Press, 
 Laud Synchronisms at CELT: Corpus of Electronic Texts at University College Cork
Rev. Eugene O'Keeffe, Book of Munster, at  Eoghanacht Genealogies
 Book of Leinster, {MS folio 150a 45} Fland cecinit at CELT: Corpus of Electronic Texts at University College Cork

External links
CELT: Corpus of Electronic Texts at University College Cork

Kings of Munster
5th-century births
522 deaths
6th-century Irish monarchs